The Port of Jimenez or Jimenez Port, is a seaport in Jimenez, Misamis Occidental, Philippines. It is managed by Philippine Ports Authority - Port Management Office Misamis Occidental/Ozamiz.

References

Jimenez Port
Transportation in Mindanao
 Misamis Occidental